Thomas King (September 5, 1879 – December 18, 1972) was a merchant, farmer and political figure in British Columbia. He represented Columbia in the Legislative Assembly of British Columbia from 1931 to 1933 and from 1934 to 1952 as a Liberal.

He was born in Angus, Ontario in 1879, the son of John Leary and Mary Scott, and was educated in Cookstown. In 1901, Leary married a Miss Woodley. He lived in Golden. He was first elected to the assembly in a 1931 by-election held following the death of John Andrew Buckham. From 1941 to 1952, King was part of a Liberal-Conservative coalition government. King died in Golden in 1972, aged 93.

References 

1879 births
1972 deaths
British Columbia Liberal Party MLAs